"Parler à mon père" is a song recorded by Canadian singer Celine Dion, released as the lead single from her 2012 French-language album, Sans attendre. It was written by Jacques Veneruso and produced by Veneruso and Patrick Hampartzoumian. "Parler à mon père" is a pop song about Dion's father who died in 2003. The track received generally positive reviews from music critics, who noted that it is one of the standout songs on Sans attendre. The Thierry Vergnes-directed music video features Dion in the middle of a desert. It became her second most viewed French video on YouTube, after "Pour que tu m'aimes encore". "Parler à mon père" was commercially successful, reaching number one in Quebec and number eight in France. It became Dion's third longest-charting single in France, after "Pour que tu m'aimes encore" and "Encore un soir", spending sixty-three weeks on the chart.

Background and release
On 7 June 2012, Dion's official website announced that during April and May, the singer began recording songs for her next French and English albums. On 29 June 2012, celinedion.com previewed a thirty-second fragment of the first single form the French-language album, "Parler à mon père". The cover art for the single was created by the illustrator Aurore Hutton, niece of former French President Valéry Giscard d'Estaing. The full version of "Parler à mon père" premiered on 1 July 2012 and the single was released to digital outlets in selected countries on the next day.

Composition
The song was written and produced by Jacques Veneruso and co-produced by Patrick Hampartzoumian. Veneruso has written several French-language hits for Dion, including: "Sous le vent," "Tout l'or des hommes," "Je ne vous oublie pas" and "Immensité," among others. Lyrically, the song is about Dion's father who died 30 November 2003. Dion said that he was her biggest fan and she thinks of him every day and knows that he is always with her, watching over her children.

Critical reception
The song received generally favorable reviews from music critics. According to Łukasz Mantiuk of All About Music, "Parler à mon père" is one of the best tracks on the album. He called it a very good song but noted that "Parler à mon père" does not reflect the material on the album which contains mostly ballads. Bernard Perusse from The Gazette commented that the performance and arrangement of "Parler à mon père" is "refreshingly subdued" and controlled. The song has an "instantly-accessible melody for Dion to navigate," which makes a "perfect vehicle for her to sail gracefully". Alain de Repentigny from La Presse wrote that it is a pop song written custom for Dion. However, he felt that this first single is no locomotive for the new album. According to Pure Charts, "Parler à mon père" is a bit nostalgic but not melancholic. Marty Tobin of Quai Baco wrote that this song is a great opener for the album, with touching lyrics and catchy music. According to him, "Parler à mon père" brings nothing new to the French music but it is done well. Lea Hermann from Focus also praised the song calling it a brisk opener for the album.

Commercial performance
"Parler à mon père" became a very successful single in Quebec, topping the chart for ten weeks. On the Canadian Hot 100 which includes mainly English-language songs, "Parler à mon père" peaked at number fifty-three. In Europe, the song reached number eight in France, number eleven in Belgium Wallonia and number twenty-five in Switzerland. It became Dion's second longest-charting single in France, spending sixty-three weeks on the chart. According to Francophonie Diffusion, "Parler à mon père" was the fourteenth most-played single worldwide during 2012 by Francophone artist.

Music video
A sneak preview of the music video for "Parler à mon père" was posted on celinedion.com on 5 September 2012 and the full video premiered the next day. It was directed by Thierry Vargnes who previously worked with Dion in 2007 on the music videos for "Et s'il n'en restait qu'une (je serais celle-là)" and "Immensité". The video was filmed in Las Vegas on 16 July 2012 and in the Death Valley. Dion is dressed in a white dress from designer Elie Saab's Spring/Summer 2012 collection. According to Pure Charts, the video for "Parler à mon père" is simple and poetic. It opens with a quote from the German poet, Angelus Silesius: "The soul is a crystal and love is its light". In the video, which is full of light, Dion appears alone in the middle of a desert. These images are interspersed with a scene where a younger woman visits the grave of her father. "Parler à mon père" music video has accumulated more than 100 million views on YouTube.

Live performances
Dion performed the song during two television specials promoting the album: in Canada on 4 November 2012 on TVA and in France on 24 November 2012 on France 2. Later on 2 December 2012, she also sang it on Chabada on France 3 and on Vivement Dimanche on France 2. On 20 December 2012, Dion performed "Parler à mon père" in another television special on NRJ 12. The song was also performed on 27 July 2013 during the Céline... une seule fois concert in Quebec City and the Sans attendre Tour in Antwerp and Paris from 21 November 2013 through 5 December 2013; the performance in the former city was included in the Céline une seule fois / Live 2013 CD/DVD.

Awards
In 2013, "Parler à mon père" was nominated for the Félix Award in category Most Popular Song of the Year.

Charts

Weekly charts

Year-end charts

Credits and personnel
Recording
 Dion's vocal recorded at Echo Beach Studios, Jupiter, Florida

Personnel

 songwriting – Jacques Veneruso
 production and arrangements – Jacques Veneruso, Patrick Hampartzoumian
 vocal recording – François Lalonde
 recording assistant – Ray Holznecht
 recording and mixing – Patrick Hampartzoumian
 drums – Laurent Coppola
 bass – Jean-Marc Haroutiounian
 guitars – Jacques Veneruso
 percussion, programming – Patrick Hampartzoumian
 background vocals – Jacques Veneruso, Agnès Puget, Delphine Elbé

Release history

References

Songs about fathers
Songs about language
2012 singles
2012 songs
Celine Dion songs
French-language songs
Songs written by Jacques Veneruso